Russell L. Mack is a United States Air Force lieutenant general who is the deputy commander of the Air Combat Command. He was previously the assistant deputy chief of staff for operations of the United States Air Force.

In July 2021, he was nominated for promotion to lieutenant general and assignment as the deputy commander of Air Combat Command.

Effective dates of promotions

References

Living people
Place of birth missing (living people)
Recipients of the Air Force Distinguished Service Medal
Recipients of the Defense Superior Service Medal
Recipients of the Distinguished Flying Cross (United States)
Recipients of the Legion of Merit
United States Air Force generals
United States Air Force personnel of the Gulf War
United States Air Force personnel of the War in Afghanistan (2001–2021)
Year of birth missing (living people)